Damir Keretić (born 26 March 1960) is a ex-professional tennis player who represented West Germany in Davis Cup in the 1980s.

Biography
The only title he won during his career was the Challenger tournament in Naples, Italy in 1981. By getting to the round of 16 at the Australian Open in December 1982 the right-hander reached a high singles ATP-ranking on 7 February 1983, when he became number 58 in the world. In 1986 he also reached the round of 16 at the French Open.

He made his Davis Cup debut for West Germany in 1983 during the Europe Zone quarterfinals against Belgium. All his Davis Cup matches were during 1983 and he won 4 of the 6 singles matches that he played.

In 2020 Keretić, as part of the consortium DAFC Fussball GMBH began proceedings to buy a controlling stake in the Scottish football club Dunfermline Athletic.

Challenger titles

Singles: (1)

References

External links
 
 

1960 births
Living people
German people of Croatian descent
Tennis players from Zagreb
West German male tennis players